The 2022 PGA Tour Canada,  commonly known as the Canadian Tour, was a series of professional golf tournaments held in Canada during 2022.

Schedule
The following table lists official events during the 2022 season.

Order of Merit
The Order of Merit was titled as the Fortinet Cup and was based on prize money won during the season, calculated using a points-based system. The top five players on the tour earned status to play on the 2023 Korn Ferry Tour.

Notes

References

External links

PGA Tour Canada
PGA Tour Canada